Stéphanie Gicquel (born 1982) is a French lawyer, explorer, and athlete. She is notable for taking part in a cross-country skiing expedition in Antarctica.

Biography 
Gicquel was born and grew up in Toulouse, France in July 1982. She later attended HEC Paris, where she would meet her future husband Jérémie.

Gicquel is most notable for taking part (along with her husband) in a cross country trek from Hercules between 14 November 2014 and 27 January 2015. The expedition (which did not use sled dogs or kites) covered 2,045 km, thus making Gicquel the record holder for the longest assisted journey across Antarctica on skis by a woman. She also participates in other athletic events such as the North Pole Marathon.

In 2019, Stéphanie Gicquel finished third in the World Marathon Challenge, a competition of 7 marathons over seven days and on seven continents.

Aside from athletics, Gicquel works as a business lawyer.

References 

1982 births
French women lawyers
French female marathon runners
French female cross-country skiers
Living people
21st-century French lawyers